Eastwood Mall is an indoor shopping center in Niles, Ohio, United States, serving the Youngstown–Warren metropolitan area. It is owned by the Cafaro Company. Its anchor stores are Boscov's, Dillard's, JCPenney, Macy's, and Target. The mall contains over 100 stores and restaurants across  of space.

History 
Eastwood Mall opened in 1969 with Sears, Strouss, Montgomery Ward, and Woolworth as anchors. It was the first mall to feature both Montgomery Ward and Sears. The JCPenney wing was added in 1979. Montgomery Ward closed in 1984, and its building was split among Gold's Gym (now a local gym), Toys "R" Us, and Carlisle's. After Carlisle's closed in 1994 and Toys "R" Us moved to a new store, those spaces both became Dillard's. Target was added onto the mall in 2000. Strouss became Kaufmann's in 1986, and Macy's in 2006.

A food court was added near Macy's in 2006, in conjunction with interior and brand renovations. In late 2007, a three-tank aquarium was added to center court. In 2012, construction began on a Residence Inn by Marriott in the Dillard's wing. Firebirds Wood Fired Grill opened next to the store later that year on December 10. On August 24, 2016, Dillard's was initially closed, but later reopened as a Dillard’s Clearance Outlet. In late 2016, the Cafaro Company added a new wing for their corporate offices and an event center, along with a new Hampton Inn & Suites. Coinciding with these, in 2017, additional renovation of the mall's entrance features and interior occurred. 

On October 15, 2018, it was announced that Sears would be closing as part of a plan to close 142 stores nationwide. In 2019, Nickels and Dimes announced that it will close the Tilt Studio location at the mall by December 2019. In 2020, Boscov's announced plans to open a store in the former Sears and Tilt Studio. It opened on October 7, 2021. It makes Eastwood Mall the first and only mall to contain a Boscov's and a Dillard's.

The Cafaro Company has been seeking investors to embark on the deforestation of an adjacent natural wetland totaling 105 acres, which would be named Enterprise Park at Eastwood. This new tract that will be connected to the existing mall property is envisioned as a mixed-use development that will include residential buildings along with office space for medical, educational, research, health care and other commercial activities.

Leasable space
The Eastwood Mall reported  of gross leasable space to the ICSC which included it in the list of largest shopping malls in the United States. However, the Directory of Major Malls reports that less than 1.6 million of gross leasable space are enclosed within the mall property itself, disqualifying themselves due to this falsely reported information the Cafaro's property is now currently ineligible for inclusion on the list of largest shopping malls in the United States based on total square feet of retail space. The greater square footage was reported because mall management included a separate strip mall, big-box stores and restaurants adjacent in the parking lot or on neighboring streets as part of the complex. Therefore, those areas were excluded as part of the criteria of a single distinct shopping mall.

References

External links
 The Eastwood Mall

Shopping malls in Ohio
Buildings and structures in Trumbull County, Ohio
Cafaro Company
Shopping malls established in 1969
Tourist attractions in Trumbull County, Ohio
Niles, Ohio
1969 establishments in Ohio